Stoneywood can refer to the following:
 Stoneywood, Falkirk, a village in Falkirk, Scotland, UK
 Stoneywood, Aberdeen, an area of the City of Aberdeen, Scotland, UK
F.C. Stoneywood, a football club from the Stoneywood area of Aberdeen